Viscount Mills, of Kensington in the County of London, is a title in the Peerage of the United Kingdom. It was created on 22 August 1962 for the Conservative politician Percy Mills, 1st Baron Mills. He had already been created a Baronet, of Alcester in the County of Warwick, in the Baronetage of the United Kingdom on 1 July 1953, and as Baron Mills, of Studley in the County of Warwick, on 22 January 1957, also in the Peerage of the United Kingdom.  the titles are held by his grandson, the third Viscount, who succeeded his father in 1988.

Viscounts Mills (1962)
Percy Herbert Mills, 1st Viscount Mills (1890–1968)
Roger Clinton Mills, 2nd Viscount Mills (1919–1988)
Christopher Philip Roger Mills, 3rd Viscount Mills (b. 1956)

There is no heir to the peerages or the baronetcy.

Arms

References

Kidd, Charles, Williamson, David (editors). Debrett's Peerage and Baronetage (1990 edition). New York: St Martin's Press, 1990.

External links

Viscountcies in the Peerage of the United Kingdom
Noble titles created in 1962